Jorge Birkner (born 18 August 1964) is an Argentine alpine skier. He competed at the 1984 Winter Olympics and the 1988 Winter Olympics. He is the brother of Magdalena Birkner, Carolina Birkner, and Ignacio Birkner.

References

1964 births
Living people
Argentine male alpine skiers
Olympic alpine skiers of Argentina
Alpine skiers at the 1984 Winter Olympics
Alpine skiers at the 1988 Winter Olympics
Skiers from Buenos Aires